Jysk may refer to:

Jysk (store), a Danish retail chain
the Danish name for the Jutlandic dialect